Chordia is a surname. Notable people with the surname include:

 Dharamchand Chordia (1949/1950–2021), Indian politician
 Mohanmullji Chordia (1902–1984), Indian social worker, educationist, businessman, and philanthropist
 Vimal Kumar Chordia (1924–), Indian politician